Leonard Byron Peterson (March 15, 1917 – February 28, 2008) was a Canadian playwright, screenwriter and novelist. He has written more than a thousand different dramatic works for stage, screen, television, and radio.

A native of Regina, Saskatchewan, he attended Luther College and Northwestern University, and served in the Canadian Infantry Corps during World War II. His career started in 1939 when he sold a script to the Canadian Broadcasting Corporation; one of his earliest successes was the radio play They're All Afraid (1944), which was written for the CBC Radio program Stage '44. The play received much criticism for depicting life in Canada negatively at a time when it was thought that boosting wartime morale was more appropriate.  They're All Afraid went on to win the award for best drama in a broadcasting festival in Ohio.  It was later adapted by Peterson for the stage.

In addition to his writing, he was a key figure in the establishment of both ACTRA and the Playwrights Guild of Canada. He was the winner of ACTRA's John Drainie Award for distinguished lifetime contributions to Canadian broadcasting at the 3rd ACTRA Awards in 1974.

Plays
 Burlap Bags (1960)
 The Great Hunger (1960)
 Look Ahead! (1962)
 All About Us (1963)
 Almighty Voice (1970)
 Women in the Attic (1971)
 The Workingman (1972)
 Let's Make a World (1973)
 Billy Bishop and the Red Baron (1975)
 Your World on a Plastic Platter (1976)
 Etienne Brule (1977)
 They're All Afraid (1980)
 Eye of the Storm (1985)

Novels
 Chipmunk (1949)

Screenplays
 It's Fun to Sing (1948)
 Passport to Canada (1949)
 Iron from the North (1955)

TV shows
 The Executioners
 Folio
 General Motors Presents
 Camera Canada

Radio Shows
 Stage '44 (1943)
 Nightfall (1981)

References

1917 births
2008 deaths
20th-century Canadian dramatists and playwrights
20th-century Canadian novelists
20th-century Canadian screenwriters
20th-century Canadian male writers
Canadian male dramatists and playwrights
Canadian male novelists
Canadian male screenwriters
Canadian radio writers
Writers from Regina, Saskatchewan